Adesmia aromatica is an endemic perennial shrub found in Chile.

References

aromatica